Anna Lasses (born 1977) is a Swedish politician.  she serves as Member of the Riksdag representing the constituency of Stockholm County. She is affiliated with the Centre Party.

References 

Living people
1977 births
Place of birth missing (living people)
21st-century Swedish politicians
21st-century Swedish women politicians
Members of the Riksdag 2022–2026
Members of the Riksdag from the Centre Party (Sweden)
Women members of the Riksdag